Amedi or Amadiya (Syriac: , Amədya), is a town in the Duhok Governorate of Kurdistan Region of Iraq. It is built on a mesa in the broader Great Zab river valley.

Etymology 
According to Ali ibn al-Athir, the name Amadiya is eponymous to Imad al-Din Zengi who built a fortress there in 1142. Another theory is that the name is named after Imad al-Dawla, but this theory is less likely.

According to Professor Jeffrey Szuchman, Amedi is of Hurrian or Urartian origin.

History
From Early Bronze Age until it came under the control of the Mitanni Empire in the 16th century BCE, Amedi region was part of the kingdom of Kurda and it was entirely inhabited by non Semitic Subarians. During the rule of the Mittanian Empire the inhabitants of this region were known as Zubarians.

After the fall of the Mittanian Empire, the city of Amedi was conquered by Ashurnasirpal I of Assyria in 11th century BCE after he fought the Nairi and Barzani people. After the fall of the Assyrian Empire, the Amedi region came under the rule of the Medes. When Xenophon passed through the region in 4th century BCE he referred to its inhabitants as Medes. Later Amedi area was incorporated into the Achaemenid Empire under the name of Media Magna. Under the rule of Parthian Empire  Amedi region was part of the Barchan (Barzan) district. eventually it became an integral part of Sasanian Empire in the district of Adiabene until it was conquered by the Muslims in 640s, after they defeated the Kurds in Tikrit, Mosul and Saharzor.

Then, for several centuries, after the expulsion of the caliphs from Baghdad in the 7th century, it was ruled by a pasha from the royal Abbas family, reputed to be one of the richest families in the region.

Amedi was the birthplace of the pseudo-Messiah, David Alroy (fl. 1160). In 1163, according to Joseph ha-Kohen's "'Emeḳ ha-Baka", the Jewish population numbered about a thousand families and traded in gall-nuts. Alroy led a revolt against the city but was apparently defeated and killed in the process. The Spanish Jewish historian R. Schlomo Ibn Verga (1450–1525) portrayed the Jewish community of Amadiya at the time of Alroy as wealthy and contented.

Amedi was the seat of the semi-autonomous Badinan Emirate, which lasted from 1376 to 1843. There are ruins of the Qubahan School in Amedi which was founded during the region of Sultan Hussein Wali of Bahdinan(1534-1576) AD for the study of Islamic Sciences. There are also ruins of a synagogue and a tomb attributed to Ezekiel a church in the small town. One of the icons of the city is the Great Mosque of Amadiya which dates back to the 12th century and the oldest and largest in the region.

In 1760, the Dominican Leopoldo Soldini founded a mission for Kurdistan in Amedi, with his colleague Maurizio Garzoni. Garzoni lived there for fourteen years and composed a 4,600 word Italian-Kurdish dictionary and grammar. The dictionary is a key work because it represents the first study of the Kurdish grammar and language; for this reason, Garzoni is often called the “father of Kurdology”.

In 1907, the population numbered 6,000, of whom 2,500 were Kurds, 1,900 Jews and 1,600 Chaldean Catholic Assyrians.

Geography

Climate
Amedi has a hot-summer Mediterranean climate (Köppen climate classification: Csa) with hot summers and cool, wet winters. Being the most northerly city in Iraq, it is the mildest major city in the country. Snow falls occasionally in the winter.

Gallery

Notable people 
 Tahsin Taha

See also
 Assyrians in Iraq
 Kurds in Iraq

References

External links 

 
Cities in Iraqi Kurdistan
Assyrian communities in Iraq
Kurdish settlements in Iraq
Populated places in Dohuk Province
Historic Jewish communities in Iraq
District capitals of Iraq
Mesas